Saint-Denis-sur-Richelieu is a municipality in the southwestern part of Quebec, Canada on the Richelieu River in the Regional County Municipality of La Vallée-du-Richelieu. The population as of the Canada 2011 Census was 2,285.

History
In 1694, King Louis XIV granted the Seigneurie of Saint-Denis to the aristocrat French Army officer, Louis-François De Gannes, sieur de Falaise of Buxeuil, Vienne, France. He named his seigniory after his wife, Barbe Denys.

A great stone Roman Catholic Saint-Denis Church was completed in 1796.

On November 23, 1837, Saint-Denis-sur-Richelieu was the site of the murder of British courier, Lieutenant George Weir by Patriotes. Subsequently, the Patriotes, calling themselves The Sons of Liberty based on the American model, won a battle here against the British Army that marked the official beginning of the Lower Canada Rebellion. Today, Saint-Denis-sur-Richelieu has a museum called the Maison nationale des Patriotes, an interpretation centre that presents a history of the Patriotes movement that was led by the villager's most famous resident, Wolfred Nelson.

On October 21s 2012, a monument to the memory of Louis-Joseph Papineau was unveiled in a park next to City Hall, along the river, by Québec Premiere Pauline Marois.

Demographics

Population
Population trend:

(+) Amalgamation of the Parish and the Village of Saint-Denis.

Language
Mother tongue language (2006)

See also
List of municipalities in Quebec
Battle of Saint-Denis (1837)

References

External links

 ; George Weir's "sadistic"  murder.
 History and architectural details of the Saint-Denis-sur-Richelieu at the Quebec religious heritage Foundation (English & French languages)
 Maison nationale des Patriotes museum information website

Municipalities in Quebec
Incorporated places in La Vallée-du-Richelieu Regional County Municipality